The Northeastern Pennsylvania Airshow, also called the NEPAirshow, is a biennial/triennial air show that occurs sometime in the summer at the Wilkes-Barre/Scranton International Airport in Pittston Township, Pennsylvania. The event features dozens of military, commercial and general aviation aircraft from around the world.

History
The air show for 2001 was cancelled due to Wilkes-Barre/Scranton International Airport seeing huge runway improvements and a new terminal building project. The show did not return; this was likely due to the air show having lost about $23,000 in 2000.

However, in 2013, Lackawanna County Commissioner Corey O'Brien proposed bringing it back in 2014. However, this fell through; the idea was met with skepticism due to the airshows failure to turn a profit its final year. Then in late 2016, the Bi-County Airport Board, which oversees the airport, pushed for the return. The event was officially announced in mid-June 2017. The airport expected at least 30,000 people to attend the 2017 air show over the two days. The air show will return on 21–22 August 2021, as 2020 went on hiatus. This airshow will feature the United States Air Force Thunderbirds.

Notable acts in 2017 
 Produced by David Schultz Airshows

Performers in 2017 
 U.S. Army Golden Knight parachute team
 U.S. Air Force F-22 Raptor Demo Team
 U.S. Air Force Heritage Flight
 U.S. Navy F/A-18 Hornet Demo Team
 Mikoyan-Gurevich MiG-17
 Short Tucano 
 P-51 Mustang
 B-25J Mitchell
 Jacquie B. Airshows
 Rob Holland Ultimate Airshows
 Kevin Russo Airshows
 Greg & Ashley Shelton Wingwalking
 Chefpitts Airshows

Static Display aircraft in 2017 

 Aeronca L-16
 Boeing-Stearman PT-17
 Boeing C-17 Globemaster III
 Douglas C-54 Skymaster
 Fairchild C-123 Provider
 Cessna O-1 Bird Dog
 Boeing CH-47 Chinook
 Northrop Grumman E-2 Hawkeye
 Boeing EA-18G Growler
 Lockheed EC-130
 Boeing KC-135 Stratotanker
 L-21B Seneca
 MC-130J Combat Shadow II
 Eurocopter HH-65 Dolphin
 Navion L-17A
 North American T-6 Texan
 Stinson L-5 Sentinel
 Stinson Voyager
 Beechcraft T-6 Texan II
 T-6G Texan
 T-38 Talon
 Titan T-51 Mustang
 TBM-3E Avenger Torpedo Bomber
 CubCrafters CC18-180 Top Cub
 Sikorsky UH-60 Black Hawk
 Eurocopter UH-72 Lakota

See also 
 Aviation in Pennsylvania

References

External links 
 Official website

Air shows in the United States
Annual events in Pennsylvania
Tourist attractions in Luzerne County, Pennsylvania
Aviation in Pennsylvania
1983 establishments in Pennsylvania
Recurring events established in 1983